Compsocerocoris elegans is a species of grass bugs (insects in the family Miridae).

References

External links 

Miridae
Insects described in 1976